The 2005 South Sydney Rabbitohs season was the 97th in the club's history. Coached by Shaun McRae and captained by Peter Cusack, they competed in the National Rugby League's 2006 Telstra Premiership, finishing the regular season in last place, and collecting their 8th wooden spoon.

Souths acquired many sound players for 2006 including Joe Galuvao, Stuart Webb, Jaiman Lowe and Ben Rogers. They also re-signed key five-eighth/lock John Sutton for several years.

Despite coming close, Souths were yet to score a win after round ten but had shown significant progress. One area of weakness nominated by fans included the half back position. An injury to regular half-back Ben Walker took a heavy toll on the team's performance. Players who have made a big impact in a losing side included David Fa'alogo (a New Zealand International) and Nathan Merritt. Merritt finished the season as the NRL's leading try scorer with 22 tries.

David Peachey came to the club after being sacked by his English club Widnes. On 11 June 2006, in his second match for the Rabbitohs, Peachey steered the bottom of the table Souths to their first win of the 2006 season with a commanding 34-14 win over the second placed Brisbane Broncos. This was Souths first win over the Broncos since 1989.

On 25 June Souths suffered their worst defeat ever, going down 66-0 to the New Zealand Warriors at Telstra Stadium. In a rare move, this catastrophic result moved the club to make a full and unreserved apology to their fans through the nation's press, in direct letters to members and through the electronic media. Souths finished the season in last place.

On 30 August 2006 Jason Taylor was appointed head coach in place of Shaun McRae for seasons 2007 and 2008.

Ladder

Player statistics

Representative Honours

References

South Sydney Rabbitohs seasons
South Sydney Rabbitohs season